American Flyer was an American folk rock supergroup.

American Flyer formed in 1976 and released two successful albums on United Artists before disbanding in 1978. They also charted one minor hit, "Let Me Down Easy", which hit No. 80 on the U.S. Billboard Hot 100 in 1976.
Their self-titled first album is also notable for having been produced by Beatles producer, George Martin.

Members
Craig Fuller (of Pure Prairie League)
Eric Kaz (of Blues Magoos)
Steve Katz (of Blood, Sweat & Tears)
Doug Yule (of Velvet Underground)

Discography

American Flyer (album)

Track listing

Reached No. 87 on the Billboard 200.

Spirit of a Woman

Track listing

Reached No. 171 on the Billboard 200

References

American folk rock groups